The Looney Tunes Spotlight Collection is a series of DVDs compiling Looney Tunes and Merrie Melodies animated shorts, released by Warner Home Video. It was created as a more family-friendly, affordable companion to the higher-priced Looney Tunes Golden Collection sets aimed at collectors. Many of the cartoons included on these sets are also already available, along with many other cartoons, on the Golden Collection sets.

Volume 1
Volume 1, released on October 28, 2003, contains Discs 3 and 4 of Golden Collection Volume 1.

Disc 1: Looney Tunes All-Stars: Part 1
Shorts 1-12 directed by Chuck Jones, 10 co-directed by Abe Levitow, 13 and 14 by Robert Clampett

Disc 2: Looney Tunes All-Stars: Part 2
Shorts 1-9 directed by Friz Freleng, 10-14 by Robert McKimson

Volume 2
Volume 2, released on November 2, 2004, contains Discs 3 and 4 of Golden Collection Volume 2.

Disc 1: Tweety and Sylvester and Friends

Disc 2: Looney Tunes All-Stars: On Stage and Screen

Volume 3
In place of Volume 3, released on October 25, 2005, is the Looney Tunes Movie Collection, contains new-to-DVD content; consisting of The Bugs Bunny/Road Runner Movie and Bugs Bunny's 3rd Movie: 1001 Rabbit Tales on separate discs. Though it technically does serve as the third volume of the Spotlight Collection.

Volume 4
Volume 4, released on November 14, 2006, based on Discs 1 and 4 of Golden Collection Volume 4.

Disc 1: Bugs Bunny Favorites
All cartoons on this disc star Bugs Bunny.

Disc 2: Kitty Korner

Volume 5
Volume 5, released on October 30, 2007, consists of Discs 1 and 2 of Golden Collection Volume 5.

Disc 1: Bugs Bunny and Daffy Duck

Disc 2: Fun-Filled Fairy Tales

Volume 6
Volume 6, released on October 21, 2008, based on Discs 1 and 4 of Golden Collection Volume 6.

Disc 1: Cartoon Superstars

Special features

Bonus cartoons

Disc 2: One-Hit Wonders
All cartoons are one-shots, except for A Cartoonist's Nightmare, which features Beans.

Special features

Bonus cartoons

Volume 7
Volume 7, released on October 13, 2009, not concurrently with a Golden Collection; Instead, it is a compilation of shorts from Golden Collections 1, 2, and 3.

Disc 1: The Best of Bugs Bunny and Road Runner

Disc 2: All-Star Cartoon Party

Volume 8
Volume 8, released May 13, 2014, a compilation of shorts from Golden Collections 2, 3, 4, and 5. It is the last volume released to date.

Disc 1
All cartoons on this disc star Bugs Bunny.

Disc 2

See also
Looney Tunes Golden Collection

References

Looney Tunes home video releases